The robust pipehorse (Solegnathus robustus) is a species of fish in the family Syngnathidae. It is endemic to southern Australia.

References

External links
 Fishes of Australia : Solegnathus robustus

robust pipehorse
Marine fish of Southern Australia
Vulnerable fauna of Australia
robust pipehorse
Taxonomy articles created by Polbot